The Allegheny Rugby Union is a non-profit corporation whose objective is to promote, serve, and manage the game of rugby union in the greater Pittsburgh area. The Allegheny area is the region described as Western Pennsylvania, Western New York, Northern West Virginia and Eastern Ohio bordering Pennsylvania in the United States of America. The Allegheny Rugby Union is a member of the Midwest Rugby Football Union (MRFU) and USA Rugby.

Senior Club

Men's Club 
Senior Division I
 Pittsburgh Forge RFC

Senior Division II
 Pittsburgh Forge RFC

Senior Division III
 Greensburg Maulers RFC
 Pittsburgh Forge RFC
 Presque Isle Scalawags RFC (Erie, PA)
 South Pittsburgh Hooligans Rugby Club

Women's Club 
Senior Division I/II
 Buffalo WRFC
 North Buffalo WRFC
 Pittsburgh Forge WRFC
 South Buffalo WRFC

Men's College
Following the bankruptcy of USA Rugby in the Spring of 2020, and the rebranding of the National Small College Rugby Organization (NSCRO) as National Collegiate Rugby (NCR), the Allegheny Rugby Union undertook a massive expansion returning Men's collegiate rugby to the conference. In Spring 2020, the ARU announced the re-launch of its D1/D2 Men's Collegiate Conference. Shortly after that it announced a new Small College Conference under the auspices of the ARU. The creation of a small college conference greatly expanded the reach of the Union as it added teams from as far west as Indiana, Kentucky, and Michigan, outside the traditional footprint of the ARU.

Currently it has five members in the D1/D2 conference and 26 members in the small college conference. The first full season of competitive play for both conferences began in Fall 2021.

Men's College Division I/II
Alderson Broaddus University 
Kent State University
Indiana University of Pennsylvania
West Virginia University
Wheeling University

Men's Small College Conference
Akron University
Ashland University
Baldwin Wallace University
Bellarmine University
California University of Pennsylvania
Case Western Reserve University
Cedarville University
Clarion University of Pennsylvania
Denison University
Earlham College
Franciscan University of Steubenville
Gannon University
Hillsdale University
John Carroll University 
Kenyon College
Malone University
Oberlin College
Ohio Northern University
Ohio Wesleyan University
Rio Grande University (OH)
Robert Morris University 
Slippery Rock University of Pennsylvania
Taylor University 
Tiffin University
Wabash College
Wittenberg University

Women's College

Women's College Division II
Indiana University of Pennsylvania WRFC
Kent State University WRFC
Notre Dame College WRFC
University of Pittsburgh WRFC
West Virginia University WRFC
Youngstown State University WRFC
 
Women's College NSCRO 
California University of Pennsylvania WRFC
Clarion University WRFC
Fairmont State University WRFC
Gannon University WRFC
Robert Morris University WRFC
St. Vincent's College WRFC

External links
Allegheny Rugby Union
National Collegiate Rugby
Midwest Rugby Union
USA Rugby

Non-profit organizations based in Pennsylvania
Rugby union governing bodies in the United States